Dança dos Famosos 2013 was the tenth season of the Brazilian reality show Dança dos Famosos which premiered on May 19, 2013, with the competitive live shows beginning on the following week on May 26, 2013 at 7:30 p.m./6:30 p.m. (BRT/AMT) on Rede Globo.

On September 15, 2013, actress Carol Castro & Leandro Azevedo won the competition over actress Bruna Marquezine & Átila Amaral and actor Tiago Abravanel & Ana Paula Guedes. Leandro is the first professional partner to win the show twice.

Couples

Elimination chart

Weekly results

Week 1
 Presentation of the Celebrities
Aired: May 19, 2013

Week 2 
Week 1 – Men
Style: Disco
Aired: May 26, 2013
Judges

Running order

Week 3
Week 1 – Women
Style: Disco
Aired: June 2, 2013
Judges

Running order

Week 4
Week 2 – Men
Style: Forró
Aired: June 9, 2013
Judges

Running order

Week 5
Week 2 – Women
Style: Forró
Aired: June 16, 2013
Judges

Running order

Week 6
Week 3 – Men
Style: Rock and Roll
Aired: June 23, 2013
Judges

Running order

Week 7
Week 3 – Women
Style: Rock and Roll
Aired: June 30, 2013
Judges

Running order

Week 8
Dance-off
Style: Foxtrot
Aired: July 21, 2013
Judges

Running order

Week 9
Deadlock
Style: Sertanejo
Aired: July 28, 2013
Judges

Running order

Week 10
Team A
Style: Funk
Aired: August 4, 2013
Judges

Running order

Week 11
Team B
Style: Funk
Aired: August 11, 2013
Judges

Running order

Week 12
Top 6
Style: Salsa
Aired: August 18, 2013
Judges

Running order

Week 13
Top 5
Style: Waltz
Aired: August 25, 2013
Judges

Running order

Week 14
Top 4
Style: Pasodoble
Aired: September 1, 2013
Judges

Running order

Week 15
Top 3
Style: Tango & Samba
Aired: September 15, 2013
Judges

Running order

References

External links
 

2013 Brazilian television seasons
Season 10